The 2015–16 Eurocup Basketball season was the 14th season of Euroleague Basketball's secondary level professional club basketball tournament, and the eighth season since it was renamed from the ULEB Cup to the Eurocup.

The 2016 Eurocup Finals were played between Galatasaray Odeabank and SIG Strasbourg, and won by Galatasaray, which was their first title in a European-wide competition. As the winners of the 2015–16 Eurocup Basketball competition, Galatasaray qualified for the European top-tier level 2016–17 EuroLeague.

Team allocation
A total of 44 teams from 15 countries participated in the 2015–16 Eurocup Basketball.

Distribution
The table below shows the default access list.

FIBA–Euroleague Basketball controversy

In July 2015, VEF Rīga, PGE Turów and Juventus withdrew from the competition for join to the FIBA Europe Cup and were replaced by Proximus Spirou, Avtodor Saratov and Szolnoki Olaj. In August 2015, ČEZ Nymburk and Telenet Oostende withdrew from the competition for join to the FIBA Europe Cup after the  draw of Eurocup and were replaced by EWE Baskets Oldenburg and MHP Riesen Ludwigsburg.

Teams
The labels in the parentheses show how each team qualified for the place of its starting round:
1st, 2nd, 3rd, etc.: League position after Playoffs
WC: Wild card
AV: Allocated vacancy from any withdrawal
EL: Transferred from Euroleague
RS: Fifth-placed and sixth-placed teams from regular season

Round and draw dates
The schedule of the competition is as follows.

Draw
The draw was held on 9 July 2015, 12:00 CEST, at the Mediapro Auditorium in Barcelona. The 36 teams were drawn into six groups of six, with the restriction that teams from the same country could not be drawn against each other. For this purpose, Adriatic League worked as only one country. For the draw, the teams were seeded into six pots, in accordance with the Club Ranking, based on their performance in European competitions during a three-year period and the lowest possible position that any club from that league can occupy in the draw is calculated by adding the results of the worst performing team from each league.
Conference 1

Conference 2

Regular season

Conference 1

Group A

Group B

Group C

Conference 2

Group D

Group E

Group F

Last 32

Group G

Group H

Group I

Group J

Group K

Group L

Group M

Group N

Knockout stage

Bracket

Eighthfinals

Quarterfinals

Semifinals

Finals

Individual statistics

Index Rating

Points

Rebounds

Assists

Other statistics

Game highs

Awards

Eurocup MVP

Eurocup Finals MVP

All-Eurocup Teams

Coach of the Year

Rising Star

Round MVP

Regular season

Last 32

Eighthfinals

Quarterfinals

Semifinals

See also
2015–16 Euroleague
2015–16 FIBA Europe Cup

References

External links
Official website

 
2015-16
Euro